One City One Book (also One Book One City, [City] Reads, On the Same Page and other variations) is a generic name for a community reading program that attempts to get everyone in a city to read and discuss the same book. The name of the program is often reversed to One Book One City, or is customized to name the city where it occurs. Popular book picks have been Harper Lee's To Kill a Mockingbird, Ernest Gaines's A Lesson Before Dying, Ray Bradbury's Fahrenheit 451, and Rudolfo Anaya's Bless Me, Ultima.

History

One City One Book programs take the idea of a localized book discussion club and expand it to cover a whole city.
The first such program was "If All of Seattle Read the Same Book" in 1998, started by Nancy Pearl at Seattle Public Library's Washington Center for the Book.
The book chosen for the program was 'The Sweet Hereafter' by Russell Banks, written in 1991. Other cities copied the idea, and the Library of Congress listed 404 programs occurring in 2007.

Each city's program has its own goals; these typically include building a sense of community and promoting literacy. Nancy Pearl warns against expecting too much from a program: "Keep in mind that this is a library program, it's not an exercise in civics, it's not intended to have literature cure the racial divide. This is about a work of literature."

Programs typically involve more than having everyone read the same book. Some other activities that have been included are: book discussion sessions, scholarly lectures on the book or related topics, a visit by the author, exhibits, related arts programming (especially showing a movie of the book if there is one), and integration into school curricula. In Boston the "One City One Story" program used shorter stories and distributed tens of thousands of free copies of the story over the course of a month.

The American Library Association (ALA) puts out a detailed step-by-step guide on how to organize a local program, including the critical step of picking the one book. The Center for the Book at the Library of Congress tracks all known programs and the books they have used.

Significant "One Book" programs 
Most listed are in the United States, perhaps because the meme started there and similar programs elsewhere have a different name.

Programs sponsored by public libraries are tracked each year by the Library of Congress.  Most programs maintain their own websites devoted to the annual effort.

United States 
The Library of Congress maintains a website with resources for cities that want to run One Book programs, including a partial list of authors and list of past programs.  Some states and the ALA maintain their own resources to help cities get started.

National
 The National Endowment for the Arts has run The Big Read since 2006. The program gives grants to communities across the nation each year to develop community-wide reading programs based on a book selected from The Big Read's library.  New titles are added to the library on a yearly basis.

By State

United Kingdom

Colleges 
Some colleges have begun One College One Book programs in addition to the more common summer reading programs for incoming First Year students. The Department of Elementary and Early Childhood Education at the College of New Jersey has been running a One Book, One Department program for all of the students in its major since 2008, requiring students to read a common work of literary non-fiction in both summer and winter breaks. The first book used was Ann Fadiman's The Spirit Catches You and You Fall Down and the book for summer 2014 is Dan Fagin's Pulitzer Prize winning Toms River.

Alternate programs 
इसका जन्म 25 जुलाई 1999 को हुआ है

Critical responses 

The concept has had a mixed reception. The literary critic Harold Bloom said, "I don't like these mass reading bees.... It is rather like the idea that we are all going to pop out and eat Chicken McNuggets or something else horrid at once."

There have been concerns that the program would be used to promote social values. The essayist Phillip Lopate fears a promotion of groupthink, saying "It is a little like a science fiction plot -- Invasion of the Body Snatchers or something."

In 2002, the effort gained controversy in New York City when two groups of selectors each chose Chang-Rae Lee's Native Speaker and James McBride's The Color of Water, respectively. Both books were considered to be offensive to some of New York's ethnic groups. Nancy Pearl said, "It's turned into something not to do with literature but to do with curing the ills in society, and while there is a role for that, to ask a book to fit everybody's agenda in talking about particular issues just does a disservice to literature."

Governments are sometimes concerned that their endorsement of reading a book will be viewed as endorsing the ideas or language of the book. In Texas in 2006, the Galveston County Reads committee recommended Mark Haddon's The Curious Incident of the Dog in the Night-Time as the choice for their county-wide read. There was much criticism of the choice from the Mayor and Council of Friendswood, who objected to obscenity in the novel, and said that it contained ideas that should not be promoted to children. They also believed that taxpayer money should not be used to promote and purchase a book the community would not approve of.

References

Book promotion
Literacy
Community building
American Library Association
Library of Congress
Organizations promoting literacy